USS Priscilla (SP-44) was the proposed designation for an auxiliary schooner that never actually served in the United States Navy.

Priscilla was built in 1884 by David Clark at Kennebunkport, Maine. Her owner, Frederick S. Fisher of New Rochelle, New York, delivered her to the U.S. Navy for possible World War I service on 19 June 1917. The Navy gave her the Section Patrol registry SP-44, but never commissioned her. The Navy returned her to Fisher on 17 December 1917.

References
 
 Department of the Navy: Naval Historical Center: Online Library of Selected Images: Civilian Ships: Mystery (Motor Boat, 1916)
 NavSource Online: Section Patrol Craft Photo Archive Mystery (SP 16)

Cancelled ships of the United States Navy
Patrol vessels of the United States Navy
World War I patrol vessels of the United States
Ships built in Maine
1884 ships